Gunnar Lauring  (31 October 1905 – 21 February 1968) was a Danish stage and film actor. He was the brother of the writer Palle Lauring (1909–1996).

Filmography 

  – 1935
 Week-End – 1935
 Panserbasse – 1936
 Blaavand melder storm – 1938
 De tre, måske fire – 1939
 En ganske almindelig pige – 1940
 Barnet – 1940
  – 1940
  – 1941
  – 1941
  – 1941
  – 1941
  – 1942
  – 1942
  – 1942
  – 1942
  – 1943
  – 1943
 Otte akkorder – 1944
  – 1944
 Mens sagføreren sover – 1945
  – 1946
  – 1946
 Brevet fra afdøde – 1946
 My name is Petersen – 1947
 Soldaten og Jenny – 1947
  – 1947
  – 1948
  – 1949
  – 1949
  – 1950
 Min kone er uskyldig – 1950
  – 1951
  – 1951
  – 1951
  – 1951
 To minutter for sent – 1952
 Vi arme syndere – 1952
 Rekrut 67 Petersen – 1952
 We Who Go the Kitchen Route – 1953
 Min søn Peter – 1953
 Sønnen – 1953
 Adam og Eva – 1953
 Arvingen – 1954
  – 1954
 På tro og love – 1955
 Kispus – 1956
  – 1956
 Qivitoq – 1956
 Taxa K-1640 Efterlyses – 1956
 Lån mig din kone – 1957
  – 1957
 Krudt og klunker – 1958
  – 1958
 Verdens rigeste pige – 1958
  – 1959
 Flemming og Kvik – 1960
 Tro, håb og trolddom – 1960
  – 1961
 Hans Nielsen Hauge – 1961
 Harry og kammertjeneren – 1961
  – 1961
  – 1961
 Hans Nielsen Hauge – 1961
  – 1962
 Den kære familie – 1962
  – 1963
 Dronningens vagtmester – 1963
 Sikke'n familie – 1963
 Døden kommer til middag – 1964
  – 1964
  – 1965
 Der var engang – 1966
  – 1966
  – 1966
  – 1966
  – 1967
 Mig og min lillebror – 1967
 Historien om Barbara – 1967

References

External links 
 

1905 births
1968 deaths
20th-century Danish male actors
Best Actor Bodil Award winners
Danish male film actors
Danish male stage actors
People from Frederiksberg